Râul Mare may refer to the following rivers in Romania:

 Râul Mare (Bârsa), tributary of the Bârsa in Brașov County
 Râul Mare, another name for the upper course of the Cibin in Sibiu County
 Râul Mare (Cugir), headwater of the Cugir River in Alba County
 Râul Mare, another name for the Cosău in Maramureș County 
 Râul Mare (Strei), tributary of the Strei in Hunedoara County
 Râul Mare, tributary of the Țibău in Suceava County

See also
 Pârâul Mare (disambiguation)